Bello Mohammed Tukur is a Nigerian politician who was elected Senator for the Adamawa Central constituency of Adamawa State, Nigeria in the April 2011 federal elections. He ran on the People's Democratic Party (PDP) platform.

Tukur was Governor Boni Haruna's deputy up to 2007.
He became Deputy Governor due to the influence of Vice President Atiku Abubakar.
For the 2007 elections, he left the PDP and attempted to become the Action Congress candidate, but after failing to win the primary, he returned to the PDP as a supporter of Professor Jibril Aminu, and Admiral Murtala Nyako.
As Governor Nyako's Chief of Staff he wielded considerable power, but did not make him popular.

A wealthy man, Tukur was a late entrant in the competition for the 2011 PDP nomination for Adamawa Central Senatorial District, which he was said to have won due to Nyako's influence.
He won the nomination with 1,095 votes. David Garvnwa came second with 378 votes and former Senator Abubakar Girei got 185 votes.

In the 9 April 2011 election for the Adamawa Central Senatorial seat, Tukur won with 95,806 votes.  Alhaji Dahiru Bobbo of the Labour Party received 78,424 votes, Fatima Balla Abubakar of the Action Congress of Nigeria (ACN) received 63,271 votes and Engineer Hayatu Z. Abubakar of the Congress for Progressive Change (CPC) gained 44,476 votes.
The result was a surprise to pundits who had expected a more charismatic Dahiru Bobbo to be the winner.

In 2021, alongside Lagos Governor, Babjide Sanwo-Olu, Seyi Tinubu and Abel Egbarin, he was given an award for his service as governor at the Media Nite Out Awards.

References

Living people
Nigerian Muslims
People from Adamawa State
Peoples Democratic Party members of the Senate (Nigeria)
Year of birth missing (living people)